The Byk is a river in Ukraine, a tributary of the Samara.

References

Rivers of Donetsk Oblast
Rivers of Dnipropetrovsk Oblast